Stone Alone is the second solo album by the Rolling Stones' bass guitarist Bill Wyman. It was released in 1976 by Rolling Stones Records. The album reached number 166 on the Billboard 200.

Van Morrison plays the saxophone in "A Quarter to Three". Joe Walsh, Dr. John, Ron Wood, Al Kooper, Nicky Hopkins and Jim Keltner played on the album.

Note that Bill Wyman is also the author of a book called Stone Alone: The Story of a Rock 'n' Roll Band, not to be confused with this album.

Critical reception
In a retrospective review, AllMusic rated the album one and a half stars out of five. They noted "Apache Woman" and "Quarter to Three" but cautioned that "highlights like these are few and far between and this problem reduces Stone Alone to a curio that should only be sought out by Bill Wyman fans and Rolling Stones completists." They criticized the album for lacking "the focus and solid songs of the previous album and ends up feeling like the typical rock star's ego-trip side project. Stone Alone can't be faulted for ambition, though: nearly every song tries out a different musical style ('50s-style rock, disco, and reggae) and Wyman enlists a veritable who's who of guest musicians (everyone from Dr. John to Al Kooper to Joe Walsh) to bring the songs to life."

Track listing
All tracks composed and arranged by Bill Wyman, except where noted.

Personnel
Bill Wyman - vocals, bass, acoustic and electric guitar, piano, percussion, horn arrangements
Bob Welch - acoustic and electric guitar
Danny Kortchmar, Terry Taylor, Jackie Clark, Ronnie Wood - electric guitar
Joe Walsh - slide guitar
John McFee - fiddle, pedal steel on "What's the Point"
Mark Naftalin, Nicky Hopkins, Joe Vitale, Al Kooper - piano
Dr. John - organ, marimba, electric piano
Paul Harris, Hubert Heard - organ
Albhy Galuten - synthesizer
Dallas Taylor - drums, percussion
Jim Keltner - drums on "Every Sixty Seconds"
Greg Errico - drums on "No More Foolin'"
Guille Garcia, Rocki Dzidzornu - percussion
Van Morrison - alto saxophone on "A Quarter to Three", harmonica on "Every Sixty Seconds", acoustic guitar on "What's the Point"
Mark Colby - saxophone on "If You Wanna Be Happy"
Floyd Cooley - tuba on "No More Foolin'"
Emilio Castillo, Lenny Pickett, Mic Gillette, Stephen Kupka - horns
Bonnie Pointer, Ruth Pointer, Clydie King, Vanetta Fields, Paula Harrison - backing vocals
Technical
Gary Kellgren, Howard Albert, Ron Albert - engineer

References

1976 albums
Rolling Stones Records albums
Bill Wyman albums
Albums produced by Bill Wyman